Olympiahalle is a multi-purpose arena located in Am Riesenfeld in Munich, Germany, part of Olympiapark. The arena is used for concerts, sporting events, exhibitions or trade fairs. The official seating capacity for the arena varies from some 12,500 to 15,500.

History 

In the past, it served as a part-time home for the defunct ice hockey team EC Hedos München. Olympiahalle opened in 1972 and was the venue for gymnastics and handball events at the 1972 Summer Olympics.

The current seating capacity of 15,500 was set after a massive overhaul was completed in 2009. A new VIP area, a restaurant and an underground second arena ("Kleine Olympiahalle") with a capacity of up to 4,000 was integrated in the new complex. The stage area was also rebuilt, which contributed to the increased seating capacity and at the same time allowed faster access for stage crews.

By February 2020, the air conditioning, other technology and lighting were modernised, and the original look from 1972 in the hall itself was restored in accordance with the monument. Most of the construction work took place while the hall was in operation.

Entertainment 

The 1977 concert of Rainbow has been released as Live in Munich 1977 in 2006.

Sports 
Olympiahalle also plays hosts to the annual Six Days of Munich, an international track cycling competition and the former Grand Slam Cup tennis tournament. Several other major international events were held in this venue, including the 1974 and the 1991 World Figure Skating Championships and the 1975 preliminaries of the Ice Hockey World Championships and the 1983, 1993 IIHF Ice Hockey World Championships finals.

Important basketball events that were held in Olympiahalle include the Final phase of the 1993 European Basketball Championships, the 1989 and 1999 Euroleague Final Fours.

World Wrestling Entertainment has hosted several house shows in the Olympiahalle since 1992 and most recently on 27 September 2008.

See also 
 List of indoor arenas in Germany

References

External links 

  
 tum.de: Olympiapark (a student project of the tum/dept Architecture) 

Indoor arenas in Germany
Indoor ice hockey venues in Germany
Defunct basketball venues
Handball venues in Germany
Buildings and structures in Munich
Sports venues in Munich
Venues of the 1972 Summer Olympics
Olympic gymnastics venues
Indoor track and field venues
Judo venues
1972 establishments in West Germany
Tennis venues in Germany
Velodromes in Germany
Sports venues completed in 1972